The Nakajima Ki-116 was a late-World War II aircraft developed for the Imperial Japanese Army Air Force. It was essentially a Ki-84 Hayate with the Nakajima Ha-45 engine replaced with a Mitsubishi Ha-112. The design was handled by Mansyū Aircraft in Manchukuo, and thus it is often designated Mansyū Ki-116.

Design and development

The Ki-116 was the last variant of the Nakajima Ki-84 Hayate to enter flight trials. It was originally the fourth Mansyu-built Ki-84-I, adapted to take a  Mitsubishi Ha-112-II (aka Kinsei 62) engine, the same engine used in the Kawasaki Ki-100, driving a three-blade propeller borrowed from a Mitsubishi Ki-46-III Dinah. The aircraft was still undergoing tests at the time of Japan's defeat. It appeared somewhat longer and had an increased tail surface area compared to the original Ki-84.

This aircraft was created as a fighter-interceptor.  There is no indication that it was intended for the Special Attack suicide role (shimbu-tai).

One aircraft was built at Manshūkoku Hikōki Seizo KK at their plant in Harbin in 1945.

Specifications
General Characteristics
 Crew: one
 Length: 9.93 m (32 ft 7 in)
 Wingspan: 11.23 m (36 ft 11 in)
 Height: 3.38 m (11 ft 1 in)
 Wing Area: 21 m2 (226 ft²)
 Empty Weight: 2,240 kg (4,938lb)
 Loaded Weight: 3,192 kg (7,039lb)
 Powerplant: Mitsubishi Ha-112-11
 Armament: 2x 20mm Ho-5 cannons in wings and 2x 12.7mm Ho-103 machine guns in upper fuselage

See also

References
Notes

Bibliography

 Aeronautical Staff of Aero Publishers Inc. Nakajima KI-84 (Aero Series 2). Fallbrook, CA: Aero Publishers, Inc., 1965. .
 
 Caruana, Richard J. "The Nakajima Ki-84 Hayate" Article and scale drawings. Scale Aviation Modeller International. Volume 10 Issue 10 October 2004. Bedford, UK.
 .
  (new edition 1987 by Putnam Aeronautical Books, .)
 Fearis, P. "The Emperor's Wings; The Nakajima Ki-84 Hayate." Article and scale drawings. Scale Aviation Modeller. Volume 2 Issue 1 January 1996. Bedford, UK.
 Green, William. War Planes of the Second World War, Volume Three: Fighters. London: Macdonald & Co. (Publishers) Ltd., 1961 (seventh impression 1973). .
 
 </ref>
 Wieliczko, Leszek A. Nakajima Ki-84 Hayate. Lublin, Poland: Kagero, 2005. . (Bilingual Polish/English)

Ki-116, Nakajima
Ki-116, Nakajima
Ki-116